Han Da-min (born Ham Mi-na on November 1, 1983) is a South Korean actress. She starred in the television drama You're Only Mine (2014).

Filmography

Television series

Film

References

External links 
 

South Korean television actresses
South Korean film actresses
Kyung Hee University alumni
1983 births
Living people